Cereal growth staging scales attempt to objectively measure the growth of cereals.

BBCH-scale (cereals)
In agronomy, the BBCH-scale for cereals describes the phenological development of cereals using the BBCH-scale.

The phenological growth stages and BBCH-identification keys of cereals are:

 1 A leaf is unfolded when its ligule is visible or the tip of the next leaf is visible
 2 Tillering or stem elongation may occur earlier than stage 13; in this case continue
with stages 21
3 If stem elongation begins before the end of tillering continue with stage 30

Feekes scale
The Feekes scale is a system to identify the growth and development of cereal crops introduced by the Dutch agronomists Willem Feekes (1907-1979) in 1941. This scale is more widely used in the United States than other similar and more descriptive scales such as the Zadoks scale or the BBCH scale. Like other scales of crop development, the Feekes scale is useful in planning management strategies that incorporate plant growth information for the use of pesticides and fertilizers to avoid damaging the crop and/or maximize crop yield.

Zadoks scale
The Zadoks scale is a cereal development scale proposed by the Dutch phytopathologist Jan Zadoks that is widely used in cereal research and agriculture.
Knowing the stages of development of a crop is critical in many management decisions that growers make.  They are represented on a scale from 10 to 92.  For example, in some countries, nitrogen and herbicide applications must be completed during the tillering stage. In France, the recommendation for the first nitrogen application on wheat is 6 weeks before Z30, with the second application on Z30. Wheat growth regulators are typically applied at Z30. Disease control is most critical in the stem extension and heading stage (Z31, Z32, Z35), in particular as soon as the flag leaf is out (Z37). The crop is also more sensitive to heat or frost at some stages than others (for example, during the meiosis stage the crop is very sensitive to low temperature). Knowing the growth stage of the crop when checking for problems is essential for deciding which control measures should be followed.

Examples of typical stages
 during tillering
Z10: one leaf
Z21: tillering begins
 during stem extension
 Z30: ear is one centimeter long in wheat
 Z31: first node visible
 Z32: second node visible
 Z37: flag leaf
 during heading
Z55: the head is 1/2 emerged.
 during ripening
Z92: grains are ripe

References

Further reading 
 J.C. Zadoks, T.T. Chang, C.F. Konzak, "A Decimal Code for the Growth Stages of Cereals", Weed Research 1974 14:415-421.

External links
 Citation Classic of 1985
Agronomy
BBCH-scale
Cereals